Grizzly Vidyalaya, residential co-educational school was established in 1999 by Grizzly Charitable Trust. The school is located in small town Teliaya Dam, Jharkhand (Bihar when the institution was first formed), India.The nearest Railway station is Koderma, Which is 14 km from the school and the nearest airport is Ranchi & Patna, which is 135 km away.
The school is affiliated with CBSE, Delhi.

History
Grizzly Vidyalaya was founded in 1999.

House
Grizzly Vidyalaya follows the house system, with five administrative units.

External links
 www.GrizzlyVidyalaya.com
 http://www.my-india.net
 http://www.indiastudychannel.com
 www.grizzlycollege.org

High schools and secondary schools in Jharkhand
Boarding schools in Jharkhand
1999 establishments in Bihar
Educational institutions established in 1999